Horijeh (also Romanized as Ḩorījeh and Ḩarījeh) is a village in Jahad Rural District, Hamidiyeh District, Ahvaz County, Khuzestan Province, Iran. At the 2006 census, its population was 246, in 36 families.

References 

Populated places in Ahvaz County